Felipe Solís Acero (born 5 February 1956) is a Mexican politician from the Institutional Revolutionary Party. He has served as Deputy of the LVIII and LXI Legislatures of the Mexican Congress representing Tamaulipas.

References

1956 births
Living people
People from Reynosa
Institutional Revolutionary Party politicians
21st-century Mexican politicians
Deputies of the LXI Legislature of Mexico
Members of the Chamber of Deputies (Mexico) for Tamaulipas